Phyllis Tate (6 April 1911 – 29 May 1987) was an English composer known for forming unusual instrumental combinations in her output. Much of her work was written for the use of amateur performers and children.

Biography
Phyllis Margaret Duncan Tate was born at Gerrards Cross in Buckinghamshire, the daughter of an architect. She was excluded from primary school by her headmistress at the age of 10 for singing a lewd song at the end of the year. She taught herself how to play the ukulele. She was discovered in 1928 by Harry Farjeon, who prompted her to receive formal music training, which she took up at the Royal Academy of Music for the next four years. While at the academy, where she studied composition, timpani, and conducting, Tate composed a number of pieces including an operetta entitled The Policeman’s Serenade. She was very self-critical, and destroyed all of her compositions from before the mid 1940s.

The first piece she would claim as her own was a concerto for saxophone and strings, written in 1944 and commissioned by the BBC. Between then and 1947 Tate composed four pieces: the concerto; a sonata for clarinet and cello (1947); Songs of Sundry Natures (1945); and Nocturne for Four Voices (1945). Tate enjoyed using atypical instrumental combinations. Songs is scored for a baritone accompanied by a flute, clarinet, bassoon, horn and harp. Nocturne is written for four voices with a string quartet, double bass, bass clarinet, and celesta. Following this period of creativity, Tate fell into a five-year slump due to illness.

Although not wishing to write larger instrumental works, Tate’s overall artistic output was extraordinary. She experimented in many genres, including orchestral music, chamber music, operas and operettas, sacred music, piano music, and vocal music, which is where she concentrated her efforts. Her most famous pieces, aside from those mentioned above, include her setting of Tennyson’s The Lady of Shalott, which was written for the 10th anniversary of the BBC Third Programme; the opera The Lodger, based on the tale of Jack the Ripper; her Prelude, Interlude, and Postlude for chamber orchestra; All The World’s A Stage; Saint Martha and the Dragon; The What d’ye Call It; A Secular Requiem: The Phoenix and the Turtle; and London Fields, a four movement suite, also commissioned by the BBC.

Although committees were not her forte, Tate was involved in several organizations, usually joining their boards. She participated in the Hampstead Music Club, the Barnet and District Choral Society (she was president and wrote Saint Martha and the Dragon for it), the Performing Rights Society’s Member Fund (she was the first woman appointed to be on their management committee), and the Composers’ Guild (where she served on the executive committee).

Tate believed that “music should entertain and give pleasure” (Fuller OUP 1). In 1979, she wrote “I must admit to having a sneaking hope that some of my creations may prove to be better than they appear. One can only surmise and it’s not for the composer to judge. All I can vouch is this: writing music can be hell; torture in the extreme; but there’s one thing worse; and that is not writing it” (Whitehouse 2). After hearing her play at a lunch one day, Dame Ethel Smyth said “At last I have heard a real woman composer!” (Whitehouse 2) However, since, at that point, Smyth’s hearing was deteriorating, Tate did not put much stock in this.

Tate married a music editor, Alan Clifford Frank, in 1935. They had two children: a son Colin, born in 1940 and a daughter Celia, in 1952. Frank worked for Oxford University Press, the company that began to publish Tate’s compositions in 1935.

Discography
 Dreams Melting. James Geer (tenor), Ronald Woodley (piano). SOMM CD 0630 (2021)
Grimethorpe. Various performers. Chandos B000000A7V, 1997.
In Praise of Women. Anthony Rolfe Johnson, tenor; Graham Johnson, piano. Hyperion B00026W65Y, 2004.
Lee Carrol Levine… Plus!. Roy Christensen, Virginia Christensen, Rebecca Culnan, Lee Carroll Levine, Craig Nies, Christian Teal. Gasparo Records B0001DMUW2, 2004.
London Landmarks. Royal Ballet Sinfonia. White Line B000067UM9, 2002.
Songs My Father Taught Me. Sir Thomas Allen, baritone; Malcolm Martineau, piano. Hyperion B00005Y0N9, 2002.
String Quartet in F major. English String Quartet. Tremula Records TREM102-2, 1993

Bibliography
Fuller, Sophie. Liner notes from In Praise of Women.  1994.
Fuller, Sophie. “Tate, Phyllis (Margaret Duncan).” Grove Music Online. Ed. L. Macy. (Accessed April 19, 2007), http://www.grovemusic.com.

Searle, Humphrey. “Phyllis Tate.” The Musical Times. Vol. 96, No. 1347 (May 1955): 244-247. 
“Tate, Phyllis (Margaret Duncan).” International Encyclopedia of Women Composers. Ed. Aaron I. Cohen. 2 vols. New York: Books & Music, Inc., 1987.
Whitehouse, Edmund. “Phyllis Tate (1911-85).” MusicWeb International. 2007 (Accessed April 25, 2007).

External links
 
 

1911 births
1987 deaths
Women classical composers
English opera composers
People from Gerrards Cross
English classical composers
20th-century classical composers
20th-century English composers
Women opera composers
Brass band composers
20th-century English women musicians
20th-century women composers